The Westland Wisp was an unmanned coaxial helicopter developed by Westland Helicopters it was powered by a pair of 5hp Korba twin cylinder two-stroke engine.

References

External links
Military Drone | Westland Wisp | Farnborough Airshow | Today | 1978
F 1287 Westland Wisp at Larkhill

Unmanned helicopters
Unmanned aerial vehicles of the United Kingdom
aircraft first flown in 1976
Coaxial rotor helicopters
1970s British helicopters
Westland Helicopters